Patrick or Pat Nolan may refer to:

Paddy Nolan (1862–1913), early Canadian lawyer
Paddy Nolan (ice hockey) (1897–1957), 1920s Canadian ice hockey player
Pat Nolan (born 1950), American lawyer
Pat Nolan (hurler) (born 1937), Irish hurler
Patrick Joseph Nolan (1894–1984), Irish physicist
Patrick Nolan (artistic director) (fl. 2000s–present), Australian director of Kura Tungar – Songs from the River (2004)
Patrick Nolan (politician) (1881–1941), Canadian politician, mayor of Ottawa